Gijs Kind (born 12 January 1972) is a Dutch rower. He competed in the men's eight event at the 2000 Summer Olympics.

References

External links
 

1972 births
Living people
Dutch male rowers
Olympic rowers of the Netherlands
Rowers at the 2000 Summer Olympics
People from 's-Gravenzande
Sportspeople from South Holland